Spånga IS FK is a Swedish football club located in Spånga. Spånga play in the 5 tier of Swedish Football.

Background
Spånga IS FK currently plays in Division 3 Stockholm Mellersta which is the fifth tier of Swedish football. They play their home matches at the Spånga IP in Spånga.

The club is affiliated to Stockholms Fotbollförbund.

The club also used to run a bandy department, but this has now merged with the bandy department of Djurgårdens IF.

Season to season

Attendances

In recent seasons Spånga IS FK have had the following average attendances:

Notable Managers
  Tommy Söderberg
  Kenneth Ohlsson

Footnotes

External links
 

Football clubs in Stockholm
1929 establishments in Sweden
Association football clubs established in 1929
Bandy clubs established in 1929
Defunct bandy clubs in Sweden